Cash and Carry is a 1937 short subject directed by Del Lord starring American slapstick comedy team The Three Stooges (Moe Howard, Larry Fine and Curly Howard). It is the 25th entry in the series released by Columbia Pictures starring the comedians, who released 190 shorts for the studio between 1934 and 1959.

Plot
The Stooges return home to their shack in the city dump after six months of unsuccessful prospecting. Just as they get to the dump, their last car tire blows. They arrive home to find it inhabited by a young orphaned woman (Harlene Wood) and her crippled younger orphaned brother, Jimmy (Sonny Bupp). At first, they want Jimmy and his sister to leave until they see Jimmy is crippled. Curly even tries helping Jimmy with his homework before Moe takes Larry and Curly outside to search for tires for their car.

They are looking around the piles of cans when Curly finds a can full of coins ("canned coin," as Curly calls it). They think the can was left by accident and start sifting through the pile of cans for more treasures. Jimmy and his sister come out of the shack talking about a few coins the girl has just earned. After asking why the brother and sister were looking, the Stooges realize it was their hidden can of money they had accidentally found and return it to them. The sister explains that they are trying to raise $500 for an operation to fix Jimmy's legs. They already had $62 saved for the operation.

Taking pity on the pair, the trio decide to help raise the rest of the money needed for the operation. They first try the bank to see if by just depositing the money into an account, the interest would raise the necessary funds. Unfortunately the banker explains that it would take years of waiting before it would grow to $500. It is then that two confidence men (Nick Copeland, Lew Davis) cheat the Stooges out of the $62 and their car for a map they claim will lead to a treasure.

The Stooges take the map and tools and go to the house on the map. Inside, they look for the "X" spot marked on the map called Walla Walla. After trying a couple walls, Curly finds an "X" marked on a wall in the basement. Mistaking a coin he dropped for the hidden treasure, he thinks he's found the correct spot. Following the map, they dig down several feet and find another wall.  This is the wall they think will lead to the treasure, but they accidentally drill into the United States Treasury.

At first, they think they have hit the jackpot. They are removing stacks of money when they are arrested. The Stooges end up meeting President Franklin D. Roosevelt, who has learned of Jimmy's plight. The President then pardons the Stooges and pays for Jimmy's operation.

Cast
Curly Howard as Curly
Larry Fine as Larry
Moe Howard as Moe
Sonny Bupp	as Jimmy (uncredited)
Nick Copeland as Con-Man (uncredited)
Lew Davis as Con-Man (uncredited)
Lester Dorr as President's Secretary (uncredited)
John Ince as Vault Chief (uncredited)
Eddie Laughton as Desk Clerk (uncredited)
Al Richardson as President Roosevelt (uncredited)
Cy Schindell as Vault Guard (uncredited)
Harlene Wood as Jimmy's Sister (uncredited)

Production notes
Involving the Stooges as miners helping a crippled orphan get money for his leg surgery, this film is notable for showing an uncharacteristically sentimental side to the comedy team. Filmed on May 4–8, 1937, the title Cash and Carry was a popular saying of the era. From 1942 to 1945, during the marriage of actor Cary Grant and heiress Barbara Hutton, tabloid newspapers referred to Grant and Hutton as "Cash and Cary".

Writer Clyde Bruckman's story was later adapted for comedian Andy Clyde in his short films A Miner Affair (1945) and Two April Fools (1954).

Nick Copeland and Lew Davis would reprise their roles as con men who swindle the Stooges in the next entry, Playing the Ponies.

References

External links 
 
 

1937 films
Columbia Pictures short films
The Three Stooges films
American black-and-white films
Films about orphans
Treasure hunt films
Films directed by Del Lord
1937 comedy films
American slapstick comedy films
1930s English-language films
1930s American films